Ab Bad-e Qahremani (also Romanized as Āb Bād-e Qahremānī; also known as Āb Yād-e Qahremānī) is a village in Khabar Rural District, in the Central District of Baft County, Kerman Province, Iran. At the 2006 census, its population was 104, in 21 families.

References 

Populated places in Baft County